Djamal Msaidié (born 20 January 1992) is a Comorian footballer who currently plays for the Coin Nord as a midfielder.

Career
In 2011, he began his career for the Coin Nord. He made his international debut for Comoros in 2011, and appeared in the Indian Ocean Games 2011 matches in group A.

References

1992 births
Living people
Association football midfielders
Comorian footballers
Comoros international footballers
Coin Nord de Mitsamiouli players